Lollschied is a municipality in the district of Rhein-Lahn, in Rhineland-Palatinate, in western Germany. It belongs to the association community of Bad Ems-Nassau.

References

Municipalities in Rhineland-Palatinate
Rhein-Lahn-Kreis